North Carolina Highway 138 (NC 138) is a primary state highway in the U.S. state of North Carolina.  It serves to connect the community of Aquadale to nearby Oakboro and Albemarle.

Route description

NC 138 is a two-lane rural highway that begins immediately after NC 742 begins in downtown Oakboro. Going east, it crosses over Long Creek, a tributary of the Rocky River, then proceeds northeast to Aquadale. After crossing a railroad track in Aquadale it goes north to end at U.S. Route 52 (US 52) just south of Albemarle.

History
NC 138 was established in 1973 as a new primary routing from NC 742 in Oakboro, through Aquadale, to US 52/NC 24/NC 27/NC 73 in Albemarle. In 2010, NC 138's northern terminus was truncated further south along a new routing of US 52.

Junction list

References

External links

 
 NCRoads.com: N.C. 138

138
Transportation in Stanly County, North Carolina